Macrobaenetes is a genus of sand-treader crickets in the family Rhaphidophoridae, found in California. There are at least four described species in Macrobaenetes.

Species
These species belong to the genus Macrobaenetes:
 Macrobaenetes algodonensis Tinkham, 1962 (algodones sand treader cricket)
 Macrobaenetes kelsoensis Tinkham, 1962 (kelso dunes giant sand-treader cricket)
 Macrobaenetes sierrapintae Tinkham, 1962 (sierra pinta giant sand-treader cricket)
 Macrobaenetes valgum (Strohecker, 1960) (coachella giant sand-treader cricket)

References 

Ensifera genera
Rhaphidophoridae
Taxonomy articles created by Polbot